David Judson Sencer (November 10, 1924 – May 2, 2011) was an American public health official who orchestrated the 1976 immunization program against swine flu. Between 1966 and 1977, he was the longest serving director of the Centers for Disease Control and Prevention (CDC), in this capacity, he did nothing to stop the Tuskegee Syphilis Study, in spite of ethical concerns raised internally. From 1981 to 1986, he was Commissioner of Health of the City of New York.

Personal life and education
Sencer was born on November 10, 1924, in Grand Rapids, Michigan. His father, who specialized in furniture, died in Sencer's early life, so his mother, Helen Furness, raised him. After receiving scholarships to Cranbrook School and Wesleyan University, he left Wesleyan before graduating and enlisting in the Navy. Subsequently, the Navy "sent him to medical school at the University of Mississippi. He completed his medical degree at the University of Michigan." During his stint at University of Michigan, tuberculosis consigned him to the hospital for a year and a half. This incident motivated him to study public health. Sencer would later go on to attain a Master's degree in public health at Harvard University. 

In 2009, he was awarded an honorary B.A. degree from Wesleyan.

In 1951, Sencer married Jane Blood Sencer, with whom he had three children: Susan, a pediatric oncologist; Ann, an oncology nurse practitioner; and Stephen, chief legal officer for Emory University.

U.S. Public Health Service career

In 1955, Sencer joined the US Public Health Service. In 1960, Sencer became the assistant director of the CDC, and in 1966, the director. In this capacity he played a major role in 1974 in establishing Emory University's public health department, which later became the Rollins School of Public Health.

The Tuskegee Syphilis Study continued under Sencer. Even when ethical concerns were raised internally in 1966 and 1968, Sencer did nothing to stop the experiment until the press got involved in 1972.

During Sencer's administration, the CDC grew considerably, addressing for the first time malaria, nutrition, tobacco control, as well as family planning, health education, and occupational safety and health. Additionally, Sencer prepared instructions for the quarantine of astronauts returning from the moon, which was suspected to harbor extraterrestrial pathogens. 
 
The agency's most successful undertaking was a smallpox-prevention project in Central Africa and later in the rest of the world. This was among the CDC's first significant dealings with international public health, which the CDC presently directs. At the forefront of the effort was William H. Foege, who said: "I never asked [Sencer] for anything that he didn't deliver...He said you couldn’t protect U.S. citizens from smallpox without getting rid of it in the world, and that was a new approach. People in the field got all the praise, but he was the unsung hero. He just kept providing what we needed."

After the swine flu outbreak of 1976, in which over 200 recruits in Fort Dix, New Jersey were infected, Sencer resolved that all US citizens should be immunized. Precipitated both by his apprehensions of a recurrence of the 1918–1919 flu plague and by President Gerald Ford's incitement, the decision was later criticized as "rash and wasteful". It led the United States Public Health Service to request up to 200 million doses of vaccine. However, the anticipated pandemic did not emerge, and "rising percentages" of the 45 million vaccinated were afflicted with Guillain–Barré syndrome, which provoked over 24 deaths. Sencer was both condemned and supported. Having worked with Sencer at CDC, epidemiologist James W. Curran, explained, "Dave Sencer made a hard choice, and he did it for the right reason — to protect the American public... He was trying to protect Americans had there been [a swine flu epidemic], and absent one, there was bound to be criticism." In 2006, Sencer wrote a report on the swine flu program: "When lives are at stake, it is better to err on the side of overreaction than underreaction... In 1976, the federal government wisely opted to put protection of the public first".

That year, Legionnaires' disease, then unidentified, killed 29 attendees of a Philadelphia American Legion conference. Sencer sent 20 epidemiologists there to investigate, and months later they attributed the disease to a type of bacteria in the air-conditioning system in the hotel where the conference was held. When Jimmy Carter's presidency began, Secretary of Health, Education, and Welfare Joseph A. Califano Jr. dismissed Sencer as "part of the normal turnover of staff when administrations change", though it took until May 1977 to replace Sencer with William H. Foege.

Later career 
After a short stint in the private sector as Senior VP, Medicine at Becton, Dickinson & Co., Sencer, in 1982, during the development of the AIDS epidemic in New York City, rejoined the public sector as the health commissioner of the city, whose mayor was Edward I. Koch. Although some appreciated his arrangement of weekly information-swapping sessions between doctors and public health officials, others, particularly those in the gay community, reprehended him for "dragging his feet". AIDS activist Larry Kramer contended, "He and his reign accounted for one of the most disastrous experiences of public health anywhere in the world... What did he do? He didn't do anything. He had a mayor who said, 'I don't want to know,' and Sencer fell into line." James Colgrove, however, acknowledged Sencer's "amending the city's codes so that AIDS cases were treated confidentially, defending the right of children with AIDS to attend public schools, and being an early advocate for a city-sponsored needle-exchange program". Colgrove agreed with critics that Sencer was a poor public educator. He neglected to disseminate information regarding sexual risk reduction for gay and bisexual men, and initially did not publicize that "casual contact" did not spread AIDS. Sencer also supported "free clean needles for addicts and fought to keep gay bathhouses open, believing they were an ideal place to teach safe sex".

Former CDC director Thomas Frieden called Sencer "a public health giant... And until the end he continued to be a thoughtful and vibrant member of the public health community. At the height of the H1N1 pandemic of 2009, he was here full time, and I said, 'Can I pay you?' He said, 'No, this is a labor of love.'"

Death
Sencer died from pneumonia on May 2, 2011, at the age of 86, in his hometown of Atlanta, Georgia.

He is the namesake of the David J. Sencer CDC Museum.

References and notes
References
https://www.bitchute.com/video/KckFn6QczJGA/

Notes

External links

 Obituary from The Daily Telegraph

|-

1924 births
2011 deaths
Centers for Disease Control and Prevention people
Wesleyan University alumni
University of Mississippi alumni
Harvard School of Public Health alumni
People from Atlanta
People from Grand Rapids, Michigan
American public health doctors
United States Department of Health and Human Services officials
University of Michigan Medical School alumni
Commissioners of Health of the City of New York
Directors of the Centers for Disease Control and Prevention
Lyndon B. Johnson administration personnel
Nixon administration personnel
Ford administration personnel
Carter administration personnel